The 13th TVyNovelas Awards, is an Academy of special awards to the best of soap operas and TV shows. The awards ceremony took place on April 29, 1995 in the México D.F. The ceremony was televised in the Mexico by Canal de las estrellas.

Edith González, Alfredo Adame and César Évora hosted the show. El vuelo del águila won 9 awards, the most for the evening. Other winners Imperio de cristal won 7 awards including Best Telenovela, Agujetas de color de rosa won 5 awards and Marimar and Volver a empezar won one each.

Summary of awards and nominations

Winners and nominees

Telenovelas

Others

Special Awards 
 Pioneer of Historical Telenovelas: Ernesto Alonso
 Highest Rated Telenovela in Mexico: Volver a empezar
 Highest Rated Telenovela in United States: Marimar
 Career as an Actor: Tito Guizar
 Career as an Actress: Katy Jurado
 Career as a Composer: Armando Manzanero

Missing 
People who did not attend ceremony wing and were nominated in the shortlist in each category:
 Emilio Larrosa
 Humberto Zurita
 Katy Jurado
 Patricia Reyes Spindola
 Pedro Weber "Chatanuga"

References 

TVyNovelas Awards
TVyNovelas Awards
TVyNovelas Awards
TVyNovelas Awards ceremonies